Masami Yoshida (14 June 1958 – 7 March 2000) was a javelin thrower from Japan, who represented his native country in three consecutive Summer Olympics, starting in 1984. He was born in Arida. He achieved his personal best (75.96 metres) on 25 August 1991 during the World Championships in Tokyo, Japan. Yoshida committed suicide in Tokyo in 2000.

Achievements

References

External links

1958 births
2000 suicides
Japanese male javelin throwers
Olympic male javelin throwers
Olympic athletes of Japan
Athletes (track and field) at the 1984 Summer Olympics
Athletes (track and field) at the 1988 Summer Olympics
Athletes (track and field) at the 1992 Summer Olympics
Asian Games gold medalists for Japan
Asian Games gold medalists in athletics (track and field)
Athletes (track and field) at the 1990 Asian Games
Medalists at the 1990 Asian Games
Goodwill Games medalists in athletics
Competitors at the 1990 Goodwill Games
World Athletics Championships athletes for Japan
Japan Championships in Athletics winners
Sportspeople from Wakayama Prefecture
Suicides in Japan
20th-century Japanese people